Chahar Qaleh-ye Vosta (also Romanized as Chahār Qal‘eh-ye Vosţá) is a village in Kuhdasht-e Jonubi Rural District, in the Central District of Kuhdasht County, Lorestan Province, Iran. At the 2006 census, its population was 27, in 4 families.

References 

Towns and villages in Kuhdasht County